Marlon Anthony Patterson (born 24 June 1983) is an English footballer who plays for Southern Counties East side Beckenham Town. He plays primarily as a left-back

Career
Born in London, Patterson played for the Millwall and Chelsea youth systems. Patterson signed for Dulwich Hamlet in December 2004 following periods with Fisher Athletic and Carshalton Athletic. He signed for Dagenham & Redbridge on 7 August 2007 from Yeading. Earlier in the 2007–08 season, he had a short loan period with Welling United before joining Grays Athletic on 25 February 2008.

Patterson signed for Histon in January 2009. He made his debut in the same month, in the FA Cup third round against Swansea City on 13 January. He left Histon in May 2009. He joined Conference South club, Chelmsford City in December 2009 and then moved to Bromley before he moved to Thurrock in February 2011. He then re-signed for Bromley at the start of the 2011–12 season, before being released at the end of the 2012–13 season.

Patterson played for Hayes & Yeading United and Chelmsford City during the 2013–14 season, before returning to Dulwich Hamlet for the start of the 2014–15 season, with the signing being funded by the Dulwich Hamlet 12th Man scheme.

After a short spell at Cray Wanderers, in March 2015, Patterson joined Hastings United of the Isthmian League Division One South.

Honours

Club
Bromley
London Senior Cup (1): 2012–13

References

External links

1983 births
Living people
Footballers from the London Borough of Southwark
English footballers
Association football midfielders
Fisher Athletic F.C. players
Carshalton Athletic F.C. players
Dulwich Hamlet F.C. players
Yeading F.C. players
Dagenham & Redbridge F.C. players
Welling United F.C. players
Grays Athletic F.C. players
Histon F.C. players
Chelmsford City F.C. players
Bromley F.C. players
Thurrock F.C. players
Hayes & Yeading United F.C. players
Cray Wanderers F.C. players
Hastings United F.C. players
Beckenham Town F.C. players
National League (English football) players
English Football League players
Isthmian League players